Learning to Breathe may refer to:

Learning to Breathe (Switchfoot album), 2000
Learning to Breathe (Larry Stewart album), 1999
"Learning to Breathe" (song), a 2007 song by Nerina Pallot